Salans may refer to:

 Salans (law firm), a former law firm
 Salans, Jura, a commune in France
 Salans, Doubs, a settlement in France